Parapercis muronis is a fish species in the sandperch family, Pinguipedidae. It is found from southern Japan to the Philippines. This species can reach a length of  TL.

References

Masuda, H., K. Amaoka, C. Araga, T. Uyeno and T. Yoshino, 1984. The fishes of the Japanese Archipelago. Vol. 1. Tokai University Press, Tokyo, Japan. 437 p.

Pinguipedidae
Taxa named by Shigeho Tanaka
Fish described in 1918
Fish of Japan
Fish of the Philippines